John Armand Mitzewich (born July 11, 1963), more commonly known as "Chef John", is an American chef known for publishing instructional cooking videos on the blog and YouTube channel Food Wishes, with over 930 million views on his channel.

Career
John Mitzewich graduated from Paul Smith's College, New York, in 1983. He received an Associate of Applied Science Degree, with Honors, in Culinary Arts/Chef Training, and was also honored as the school's 1983 "Outstanding Chef Training Student". He has held various positions throughout the restaurant industry, including Executive Sous Chef at the Carnelian Room, Sous Chef at Ryan's Café, and Garde Manger at the San Francisco Opera. Mitzewich was a Chef Instructor at the California Culinary Academy in San Francisco for five years before leaving to focus on teaching people to cook online.

He has a partnership with the online food network Allrecipes.com, and has published a cookbook for Paragon Publishing, America's Family Favorites: The Best of Home Cooking. In 2011, he was awarded Best Home Chef in a Series by Taste TV.

YouTube 
Perhaps uniquely among Internet food writers, each of Mitzewich's recipes is split between the blog and the video instructions on his YouTube channel, with the exact written ingredient amounts and background information about the recipe being posted on the blog, and the method for preparing the recipe not being written but instead explained through the video on YouTube (which otherwise does not typically describe the exact amounts of all ingredients). He has noted that this allows him to get "paid twice" from the advertising on both sites.

As of January 2023, Mitzewich has over 4.3 million subscribers to his YouTube channel with over 980 million views. Mitzewich has a content partnership deal with YouTube.

Style
A differentiating aspect of Mitzewich's videos on YouTube is his way of filming. He deliberately keeps himself out of the shot, only displaying utensils, ingredients and his hands. He records the narration later. His narrations are always done in a wandering and almost singing tone of voice, with one rhyming wordplay joke per video.

A unique aspect of Mitzewich's cooking is the inclusion of powdered cayenne pepper in almost every recipe. He describes the addition of the spice as giving an "extra touch of the heat and bringing the unique tastes of the dishes forward".

References

Further reading
 

Living people
American chefs
American male chefs
American YouTubers
1963 births
People from Clifton Springs, New York
California Culinary Academy alumni
Food and cooking YouTubers